Clyde is an unincorporated community located in the town of Casco, Kewaunee County, Wisconsin, United States.

References

Unincorporated communities in Kewaunee County, Wisconsin
Unincorporated communities in Wisconsin